John Arthur Fihelly (7 November 1882 – 2 March 1945)  was a public servant, politician and rugby union player in Queensland, Australia. He was the Treasurer of Queensland. He represented Australia as a professional rugby league footballer and a founder of the Queensland Rugby League.

Early life

Fihelly was born in Timoleague, County Cork, Ireland. The family emigrated to Australia the following year. He was educated at the Petrie Terrace State School and St Joseph's College, Gregory Terrace, until 1895. He then joined the post office as a telegraph messenger. He eventually transferred to the Department of Trade and Customs.

Rugby

Fihelly was a rugby union flanker. and claimed one international rugby union cap for Australia, in 1907. He then became one of rugby league football's founding players in Brisbane, being selected to represent Queensland during the 1907–08 New Zealand rugby tour of Australia and Great Britain against the visiting "All Blacks" in what were the first games of rugby league football ever played in Queensland. In 1908 he traveled to Britain on the first rugby league Kangaroo tour as assistant manager.
Fihelly represented Queensland in rugby union 1905–07 against New South Wales.

Politics

Fihelly got his start in 1908 when he joined the Department of Trade and Customs as a junior clerk in its State office. In 1918 Fihelly was made secretary of railways.

He was elected as the Labor member for Paddington in the Legislative Assembly of Queensland in 1912 and held several ministerial roles including Attorney-General and Treasurer until his resignation in 1922.

Later life
Fihelly died of a cerebral thrombosis on 2 March 1945. He deteriorated for years after fracturing his skull in September 1926 in an accident at Sandgate. Before dying, Fihelly spent time in the Dunwich Benevolent Institution.

Upon his death in 1945, Fihelly was rewarded with a State funeral at St Stephen's Cathedral and was buried in Toowong Cemetery.

References

1882 births
Australia international rugby union players
Australian rugby league administrators
Australian rugby league players
Australian rugby union players
Burials at Toowong Cemetery
Deputy Premiers of Queensland
Queensland rugby league team players
1945 deaths
Treasurers of Queensland
Members of the Queensland Legislative Assembly
Attorneys-General of Queensland
20th-century Australian politicians
Rugby union flankers
Rugby union players from County Cork